The 2013 South Carolina Gamecocks baseball team represented the University of South Carolina in the 2013 NCAA Division I baseball season.  The Gamecocks played their home games in Carolina Stadium. The team was coached by Chad Holbrook, who was in his first season as head coach at Carolina.

Personnel

Roster

2013 South Carolina Gamecocks Baseball Roster & Bios http://gamecocksonline.cstv.com/sports/m-basebl/mtt/scar-m-basebl-mtt.html

Coaching staff

2013 South Carolina Gamecocks Baseball Coaches & Bios http://gamecocksonline.cstv.com/sports/m-basebl/mtt/scar-m-basebl-mtt.html#coaches

Schedule

! style="background:#73000A;color:white;"| Regular Season
|- valign="top" 

|- bgcolor="#ccffcc"
| 1 || February 15 ||  || Carolina Stadium || 4-3 || Montgomery (1–0) || Herndon (0–1) || Webb (1) || 8,242 || 1–0 || –
|- bgcolor="#bbbbbb"
| – || February 16 || Liberty || Carolina Stadium || colspan=7 |Postponed
|- bgcolor="#ccffcc"
| 2 || February 17 || Liberty || Carolina Stadium || 8-7 || Westmoreland (1-0) || Richardson (0-1) || None || 7,513 || 2–0 ||–
|- align="center" bgcolor="#ffbbb"
| 3 || February 17 || Liberty || Carolina Stadium || 2-37 || Lambert (1-0) || Belcher (0-1) || Perritt (1) || 7,513 || 2–1 || –
|- bgcolor="#bbbbbb"
| – || February 22 ||  || Carolina Stadium || colspan=7 |Postponed
|- bgcolor="#ccffcc"
| 4 || February 23 || Albany || Carolina Stadium || 8–3 || Montgomery (2-0) || Graham (0-1) || Britt (1) || 7,184 || 3–1 ||–
|- bgcolor="#ccffcc"
| 5 || February 24 || Albany || Carolina Stadium || 14-1 || Holmes (1-0) || Zielinski (0-2) || None || 7,260 || 4–1 || –
|- bgcolor="#ccffcc"
| 6 || February 24 || Albany || Carolina Stadium || 6-4 || Belcher (1-1) || Chase (0-2) || Webb (2) || 7,260 || 5–1 || –
|- bgcolor="#ccffcc"
| 7 || February 26 ||  || Carolina Stadium || 5-2 || Wynkoop (1-0) || Warford (0-1) || Webb (3) || 6,301 || 6–1 ||–
|-

|- bgcolor="#ccffcc"
| 8 || March 1 || @ Clemson || Doug Kingsmore Stadium || 6-0 || Montgomery (3-0) || Gossett (1-1) || None || 6,016 || 7–1 ||–
|- align="center" bgcolor="#ffbbb"
| 9 || March 2 || vs. Clemson || Fluor Field || 3-6 || Schmidt (2-0) || Holmes (1-1) || Campbell (3) || 7,125 || 7–2 ||–
|- bgcolor="#ccffcc"
| 10 || March 3 || Clemson || Carolina Stadium || 8-0 || Belcher (2-1) || Firth (2-1) || None || 8,242 || 8–2 ||–
|- bgcolor="#ccffcc"
| 11 || March 5 ||  || Carolina Stadium || 10-0 || Wynkoop (2-0) || Bautista (0-2) || None || 6,140 || 9–2 ||–
|- bgcolor="#ccffcc"
| 12 || March 6 || Ball State || Carolina Stadium || 14-4 || Sullivan (1-0) || Manering (0-2) || None || 6,228 || 10–2 ||–
|- bgcolor="#ccffcc"
| 13 || March 8 ||  || Carolina Stadium || 2-0 || Beal (1-0) || Smith (2-1) || Webb (4) || 6,715 || 11–2 || –
|- bgcolor="#ccffcc"
| 14 || March 9 || Rider || Carolina Stadium || 9-5 || Seddon (1-0) || Sowa (2-1) || Westmoreland (1) || 7,231 || 12–2 || –
|- bgcolor="#ccffcc"
| 15 || March 10 || Rider || Carolina Stadium || 1-0 || Belcher (3-1) || Murphy (1-2) || Webb (5) || 7,031 || 13–2 ||–
|- bgcolor="#ccffcc"
| 16 || March 12 ||  || Carolina Stadium || 12-3 || Wynkoop (3-0) || Cox (1-2) || Sullivan (1) || 6,447 || 14–2 || –
|- bgcolor="#ccffcc"
| 17 || March 13 ||  || Carolina Stadium || 12-4 || Britt (1-0) || Caudill (0-1) || None || 6,450 || 15–2 || –
|- bgcolor="#ccffcc"
| 18 || March 15 || @ Missouri|| Taylor Stadium || 4-1 || Beal (2-0) || Zastryzny (1-3) || Webb (6) || 3,145 || 16–2 || 1–0
|- bgcolor="#ccffcc"
| 19 || March 16 || @ Missouri || Taylor Stadium || 2-0 || Belcher (4-1) || Graves (0-2) || Webb (7) || 826 || 17–2 || 2–0
|- align="center" bgcolor="#ffbbb"
| 20 || March 16 || @ Missouri || Taylor Stadium || 0-4 || Steele (2-0) || Holmes (1-2) || None || 826 || 17–3 || 2–1
|- bgcolor="#ccffcc"
| 21 || March 19 || @ The Citadel || Joseph P. Riley Jr. Park || 9-5 || Wynkoop (4-0) || Cribb (1-2) || Webb (8) || 5,838 || 18–3 ||–
|- align="center" bgcolor="#ffbbb"
| 22 || March 22 || Arkansas || Carolina Stadium || 3-15 || Astin (2-1) || Beal (2-1) || None || 7,616 || 18–4 || 2–2
|- align="center" bgcolor="#ffbbb"
| 23 || March 23 || Arkansas || Carolina Stadium || 2-4 || Stanek (2-1) || Belcher (4-2) || None || 7,509 || 18–5 || 2–3
|- align="center" bgcolor="#ffbbb"
| 24 || March 24 || Arkansas || Carolina Stadium || 3-511 || Killian (3-2) || Webb (0-1) || Suggs (1) || 7,208 || 18–6 || 2–4
|- bgcolor="#ccffcc"
| 25 || March 26 || @  || CofC Baseball Stadium at Patriot's Point || 3-1 || Holmes (2-2) || Helvey (2-2) || Westmoreland (2) || 1,526 || 19–6 ||–
|- bgcolor="#ccffcc"
| 26 || March 28 ||  || Carolina Stadium || 3-2 || Westmoreland (2-0) || Freeman (1-1) || Webb (9) || 6,949 || 20–6 || 3–4
|- bgcolor="#ccffcc"
| 27 || March 29 || Texas A&M || Carolina Stadium || 6-4 || Belcher (5-2) || Martin (2-4) || Webb (10) || 7,943 || 21–6 || 4–4
|- bgcolor="#ccffcc"
| 28 || March 30 || Texas A&M || Carolina Stadium || 6-3 || Westmoreland (3-0) || Jester (2-1) || Webb (11) || 8,242 || 22–6 || 5–4
|-

|- bgcolor="#ccffcc"
| 29 || April 2 ||  || Carolina Stadium || 9-5 || Holmes (3-2) || Leopard (1-2) || None || 8,114 || 23–6 || –
|- align="center" bgcolor="#ffbbb"
| 30 || April 3 || @  || Fluor Field || 5-6 || Carlson (3-1) || Wynkoop (4-1) || Solter (6) || 4,738 || 23–7 ||–
|- bgcolor="#ccffcc"
| 31 || April 5 || @  || Lindsey Nelson Stadium || 5-4 || Webb (1-1) || Godley (2-3) || None || 3,110 || 24–7 || 6–4
|- bgcolor="#ccffcc"
| 32 || April 6 || @ Tennessee || Lindsey Nelson Stadium || 12-8 || Westmoreland (4-0) || Williams (1-2) || None || 2,454 || 25–7 || 7–4
|- bgcolor="#ccffcc"
| 33 || April 7 || @ Tennessee || Lindsey Nelson Stadium || 19-2 || Holmes (4-2) || Godley (2-4) || None || 2,637 || 26–7 || 8–4
|- bgcolor="#ccffcc"
| 34 || April 9 || The Citadel || Carolina Stadium || 6-5 || Britt (2-0) || Rivera (4-1) || None || 7,721 || 27–7 ||–
|- align="center" bgcolor="#ffbbb"
| 35 || April 11 || @ Florida || McKethan Stadium || 2-3 || Crawford (2-5) || Belcher (5-3) || Magliozzi (7) || 3,268 || 27–8 || 8–5
|- align="center" bgcolor="#ffbbb"
| 36 || April 12 || @ Florida || McKethan Stadium || 3-4 || Rhodes (1-0) || Westmoreland (4-1) || Magliozzi (8) || 4,515 || 27–9 || 8–6
|- align="center" bgcolor="#ffbbb"
| 37 || April 13 || @ Florida || McKethan Stadium || 5-14 || Gibson (2-0) || Wynkoop (4-2) || None || 4,374 || 27–10 || 8–7
|- bgcolor="#ccffcc"
| 38 || April 16 ||  || Carolina Stadium || 10-6 || Fiori (1-0) || Loving (1-2) || None || 7,433 || 28–10 ||–
|- bgcolor="#bbbbbb"
| – || April 19 || Kentucky || Carolina Stadium || colspan=7 |Postponed
|- bgcolor="#ccffcc"
| 39 || April 20 || Kentucky || Carolina Stadium || 5-2 || Belcher (6-3) || Reed (2-5) || Westmoreland (3) || 7,411 || 29–10 || 9–7
|- bgcolor="#ccffcc"
| 40 || April 20 || Kentucky || Carolina Stadium || 7-611 || Webb (2-1) || Gott (4-1) || None || 8,148 || 30–10 || 10–7
|- bgcolor="#ccffcc"
| 41 || April 21 || Kentucky || Carolina Stadium || 3-1 || Wynkoop (5-2) || Littrell (4-3) || Webb (12) || 8,024 || 31–10 || 11–7
|- align="center" bgcolor="#ffbbb"
| 42 || April 23 || @  || Veteran's Field at Keeter Stadium || 6-7 || Warner (3-0) || Seddon (1-1) || None || 4,825 || 31–11 || –
|- align="center" bgcolor="#ffbbb"
| 43 || April 26 || @ LSU || Alex Box Stadium || 2-5 || Nola (8-0) || Belcher (6-4) || None || 9,006 || 31–12 || 12–7
|- bgcolor="#ccffcc"
| 44 || April 27 || @ LSU || Alex Box Stadium || 4-2 || Westmoreland (5-1) || Cotton (2-1) || Webb (13) || 10,246 || 32–12 || 12–8
|- bgcolor="#ccffcc"
| 45 || April 28 || @ LSU || Alex Box Stadium || 4-0 || Wynkoop (6-2) || McCune (3-1) || Webb (14) || 6,380 || 33–12 || 13–8
|-

|- align="center" bgcolor="#ffbbb"
| 46 || May 3 || Vanderbilt || Carolina Stadium || 2-3 || Ziomek (9-2) || Belcher (6-5) || Miller (13) || 8,081 || 33–13 || 13–9
|- align="center" bgcolor="#ffbbb"
| 47 || May 4 || Vanderbilt || Carolina Stadium || 2-5 || Beede (12-0) || Montgomery (3-1) || Fulmer (4) || 8,029 || 33–14 || 13–10
|- bgcolor="#bbbbbb"
| – || May 5 || Vanderbilt || Carolina Stadium || colspan=7 |Canceled
|- bgcolor="#ccffcc"
| 48 || May 8 ||  || Carolina Stadium || 9-3 || Westmoreland (6-1) || Stillman (2-2) || None || 7,193 || 34–14 ||–
|- bgcolor="#ccffcc"
| 49 || May 10 ||  || Carolina Stadium || 7-2 || Belcher (7-5) || McLaughlin (4-6) || None || 7,809 || 35–14 || 14–10
|- bgcolor="#ccffcc"
| 50 || May 11 || Georgia || Carolina Stadium || 7-1 || Montgomery (4-1) || Dieterich (2-3) || None || 8,242 || 36–14 || 15–10
|- bgcolor="#ccffcc"
| 51 || May 12 || Georgia || Carolina Stadium || 8-3 || Wynkoop (7-2) || Walsh (2-4) || None || 7,478 || 37–14 || 16–10
|- bgcolor="#ccffcc"
| 52 || May 14 ||  || Carolina Stadium || 4-3 || Sullivan (2-0) || Corbin (2-4) || Webb (15) || 7,827 || 38–14 || –
|- align="center" bgcolor="#ffbbb"
| 53 || May 16 || @ Mississippi State || Dudy Noble Field || 4-5 || Girodo (6-1) || Webb (2-2) || Holder (15) || 6,755 || 38–15 || 16–11
|- bgcolor="#ccffcc"
| 54 || May 17 || @ Mississippi State || Dudy Noble Field || 5-3 || Westmoreland (7-1) || Bradford (0-1) || Webb (16) || 6,932 || 39–15 || 17–11
|- align="center" bgcolor="#ffbbb"
| 55 || May 18 || @ Mississippi State || Dudy Noble Field || 2-7 || Mitchell (10-0) || Wynkoop (7-3) || None || 7,687 || 39–16 || 17–12
|-

|-
! style="background:#73000A;color:white;"| Post-Season
|-

|- align="center" bgcolor="#ffbbb"
| 56 || May 22 || Mississippi State || Hoover Metropolitan Stadium || 3-5 || Gentry (4-0) || Westmoreland (7-2) || None || 5,913 || 39–17 || 0–1
|- align="center" bgcolor="#ffbbb"
| 57 || May 23 || Vanderbilt || Hoover Metropolitan Stadium || 3-410 || Fulmer (2-0) || Westmoreland (7-3) || None || 5,705 || 39–18 || 0–2
|-

|- bgcolor="#ccffcc"
| 58 || May 31 || Saint Louis || Carolina Stadium || 7-3 || Webb (3-2) || Smith (8-3) || None || 7,437 || 40–18 || 1–0
|- bgcolor="#ccffcc"
| 59 || June 1 ||  || Carolina Stadium || 19-3 || Montgomery (5-1) || Roy (7-6) || None || 7,816 || 41–18 || 2–0
|- bgcolor="#bbbbbb"
| - || June 2 || Liberty || Carolina Stadium || colspan=7 |Suspended
|- bgcolor="#ccffcc"
| 60 || June 3 || Liberty || Carolina Stadium || 6-4 || Holmes (5-2) || Perritt (3-2) || Webb (17) || 7,391 || 42–18 || 3–0
|-

|- align="center" bgcolor="#ffbbb"
| 61 || June 8 || North Carolina || Boshamer Stadium || 5-6 || Thornton (10-1) || Webb (3-3) || None || 4,355 || 42–19 || 3–1
|- bgcolor="#ccffcc"
| 62 || June 9 || North Carolina || Boshamer Stadium || 8-0 || Montgomery (6-1) || Johnson (4-1) || None || 4,365 || 43–19 || 4–1
|- bgcolor="#bbbbbb"
| – || June 10 || North Carolina || Boshamer Stadium || colspan=7 |Postponed
|- align="center" bgcolor="#ffbbb"
| 63 || June 11 || North Carolina || Boshamer Stadium || 4-5 || Thornton (11-1) || Westmoreland (7-4) || Emanuel (1) || 4,100 || 43–20 || 4–2
|-

2013 South Carolina Gamecocks Baseball Schedule http://gamecocksonline.cstv.com/sports/m-basebl/sched/scar-m-basebl-sched.html

Honors and awards

 LB Dantzler was named SEC Player of the Week on February 25.
 Grayson Greiner was named Second-Team All-SEC.
 Joey Pankake was named Collegiate Baseball's National Player of the Week and SEC Player of the Week on March 11.
 Max Schrock was named SEC Freshman of the Week on April 8.
 Tyler Webb was named Third-Team All-American by Collegiate Baseball and Second-Team All-SEC.
 Jack Wynkoop was named SEC Freshman of the Week on April 22 and April 29, and was named to the SEC All-Freshman Team.

Notes
 On February 24, three pitchers combined to throw the first South Carolina no-hitter since March 26, 1975.

Rankings

Gamecocks in the 2013 MLB Draft
The following members of the South Carolina Gamecocks baseball program were drafted in the 2013 Major League Baseball Draft.

References

External links
 Gamecock Baseball official website

South Carolina Gamecocks baseball seasons
South Carolina Gamecocks Baseball Team, 2013
2013 NCAA Division I baseball tournament participants
South Carolina Gamecocks baseball